Valaramanikam  is a village in the  
Arimalamrevenue block of Pudukkottai district, Tamil Nadu, India.

Demographics 

As per the 2011 census, Valaramanikam had a total population of 1849  with 890 males and 959 females.

References

Villages in Pudukkottai district